RFA Stromness (A344) was a fleet stores ship which served the Royal Fleet Auxiliary until sold to the U.S. Navy's Military Sealift Command in 1983. While in the service of British forces, it saw service in the Falklands War. After the sale to the United States, it was renamed USNS Saturn (T-AFS-10) and acted as a combat stores ship until it was deactivated in 2009; it was able to supply two other ships at once. In 2010, it was sunk in an exercise by the U.S. Carrier Strike Group Two off the coast of North Carolina.

Construction
Originally known as RFA Stromness (A344), the vessel was built at Swan Hunter & Wigham Richardson Ltd, Wallsend as Yard Nr 2017, United Kingdom, for the Royal Navy. She was laid down on 5 October 1965 and launched on 16 September 1966.

RFA operational history 
In 1973 she brought the expedition members of the Joint Services Egmont Islands Expedition (JSEI) from the Egmont Atoll back to Gan, Addu Atoll after their mission was over. Led by Sqn Leader "Dickie" Bird RAF, it was the first scuba diving expedition in the Chagos Archipelago. Following its success, a second expedition was undertaken to Danger Island the following year.

In 1982, Stromness saw service during the Falklands War, where she carried over 400 troops of 45 Commando Royal Marines to the beach landing in San Carlos Water.

Sale to the U.S. Navy
In 1983 Stromness was sold to the United States Navy.  She was placed into non-commissioned service with Military Sealift Command and renamed USNS Saturn (T-AFS-10).

Military Sealift Command Mission 
Saturn was one of five combat stores ships operated by Military Sealift Command. She provided fuel, food, ammunition and ocean towing services to U.S. Navy ships around the world. Saturn carried virtually every type of food and supply needed by Navy ships. Saturn carried spare and repair parts for other ships and aircraft and also had a limited capability to transfer fuel to other Navy ships at sea. Supplies and fuel are transferred to other ships using lines and hoses suspended above the water to another ship as the ships move forward at the same speed and sometimes less than 50 feet apart.

Saturn was capable of replenishing two ships at the same time, one on either side, using this side-by-side technique. Dry stores were also transferred by using helicopters to lift large cargo nets and pallets loaded with supplies and parts. Saturn had elevators and mobile equipment for handling stores internally on the ship. Helicopters were not assigned to Saturn on a full-time basis, but flew aboard for extended periods of time while the ship was at sea.

Civilian Mariners (CIVMARS) on board USNS Saturn were a vital part of the Military Sealift Command (MSC) Fleet. Their areas of expertise encompass a wide variety of occupations ranging primarily from the engineering, deck and supply departments. Final complement was approximately 120 personnel. Tour lengths were 4 months in duration with an extension option available.

Enlisted ratings on board included Operations Specialists, Information Systems Technicians, Electronics Technicians, Personnelmen and Storekeepers. Final tour length for enlisted military members aboard Saturn was 12 months. Officers served up to a two-year tour.

Saturn operational history

The Saturn was deactivated on 6 April 2009 and sunk as a target ship for weapons in a sinking exercise (SINKEX) by ships and aircraft of the George H.W. Bush Carrier Strike Group off the coast of North Carolina on 27 October 2010.

References

  
 USNS Saturn  (T-AFS 10) 

 

Ness-class combat stores ships
Ships built on the River Tyne
1966 ships
Falklands War naval ships of the United Kingdom
Sirius-class combat stores ships
Cold War auxiliary ships of the United States
Ships sunk as targets
Ships built by Swan Hunter
Maritime incidents in 2010